Oligospira waltoni is a species of air-breathing land snails, terrestrial pulmonate gastropod mollusks in the family Acavidae. It is endemic to Sri Lanka.

Description
It has a rosy brown shell with a dark brown lip.

References

External links

Acavidae
Gastropods described in 1842